Exercise Northern Edge is Alaska's premier military joint training exercise.
Alaskan Command (ALCOM) uses expansive Alaskan training ranges to conduct this joint training operation.

History

Jack Frost (1975-1979) 
Northern Edge evolved over the years from the Jack Frost, Brim Frost and Arctic Warrior exercises. The Jack Frost was composed by three exercitations held in 1975, 1976 and 1979.

The first of these was Jack Frost '75, an Alaskan Command-sponsored exercise. Jack Frost '75 focused on joint operations and training in an Arctic environment.

Jack Frost '76 marked the beginning of the exercises sponsored by the United States Readiness Command. This year, units from the 9th Infantry Division from Ft. Lewis, WA included the 3/34FA and 2/47 Infantry deployed in the field to test cold weather operations. In addition, in 1976, a detachment of the 337th Army Security Agency Company provided electronic warfare training which included electronic countermeasures (ECM), electronic counter countermeasures (ECCM), and communications security.

Jack Frost '77 exercised command and control techniques and procedures for joint task force operations. Later that year, US Readiness Command learned that the nickname, Jack Frost, was prohibited by JCS publications. The command received approval for the name Brim Frost, and the final Jack Frost exercise ran in 1979.

Brim Frost (1981-1989) 
Brim Frost was composed by 5 exercitation.

The first, Brim Frost '81 - held in 1981 - was sponsored by US Readiness Command.

Brim Frost '83 was conducted from January 10 to February 11, 1983. Brim Frost '85 began December 10, 1984 and concluded January 24, 1985, with more than 18,000 military troops participating. All three of these operations exercised the ability of Joint Task Force Alaska to conduct winter operations.

Brim Frost '87 involved more than 24,000 active and reserve Army, Air Force, Coast Guard, and Navy personnel. More than 143 Air Force aircraft, 130 Army aircraft, and five major Coast Guard cutters were employed during Brim Frost '87. Brim Frost '89, sponsored by Forces Command, involved more than 26,000 troops and cost $15 million. This exercise involved numerous communications initiatives such as Airborne Warning and Control System (AWACS) aircraft, satellites, and electronic intelligence.

Brim Frost '89 aimed to include more than 26,000 troops, however nearly all of the units that were slated to participate dropped out of the exercise following the crash due to extreme weather of a Canadian C-130 military transport plane and the death of 9 Canadians at Ft. Wainwright in Fairbanks, Alaska. The only units to participate were the 4th and 5th Battalions of the U.S. Army's 9th Infantry Regiment, 6th Infantry Division, some units of the Alaska National Guard and their necessary support units. Also the 2nd Battalion of the 17th Infantry Regiment who were deployed to Kodiak Island for the duration of the exercise.  During this exercise temperatures as low as -80 F and colder were reported along with a North American-record high atmospheric pressure of 31.85 inches. The Official temperature recorded in Fairbanks, Alaska was -67 F.

Arctic Warrior 1991 
Arctic Warrior '91 replaced the Brim Frost exercises with the reestablishment of Alaska Command in 1990. It also transferred the exercise sponsorship from Forces Command to Pacific Command. The exercise ran from January 25 to February 6, 1991. It featured live fire and had more than 10,000 troops participating.

Northern Edge 1993–2004 

The first Northern Edge exercise took place in 1993. This exercise was scaled in comparison. ALCOM designed it to be an internal training event for the headquarters and component headquarters staffs. The exercise emphasized the joint operations, campaign planning and logistics planning.

Northern Edge '94 field training exercise from March 11 to March 18, 1994, was considerably larger than 1993, involving more than 14,600 military personnel. ALCOM activated the joint task force Northern Edge in response to a simulated National Command Authority mission that provided forces to conduct peace enforcement operations.

Northern Edge '95 and '96 each consisted of three phases, and included more than 14,000 personnel participated in the joint exercise. This exercise tested and validated ALCOM's ability to field a deployable joint task force.

Northern Edge '97, with more than 9,000 personnel, divided its field training into two parts, held in different locations. Major air and ground maneuver were held at Fort Greely. The naval harbor defense portion was held at Seward, Alaska. Planners focused on night high-tech activities, air interdiction, deep strike missions and the land maneuver forces during conventional ground combat.

Northern Edge '98 began with a mass airborne drop of 600 troops in training areas southeast of Fairbanks, while maritime forces began protecting the harbor in Ketchikan. The mock town of Simpsonville was used for joint live fire exercises, which became a pivotal part of the field training. Apache helicopters supported a brigade air assault and more than 1,200 sorties assisted air operations. The  was the high value unit for the port security portion of the exercise and the U. S. Marine Corps Fleet Anti-terrorism Security Team (FAST) was the main defender alongside Navy and Coast Guard active and reserve harbor defense units and personnel.

Northern Edge '99 included a night airborne mass jump, a brigade air assault, more than 1,200 air sorties flown, theatre missile defense, information operations, harbor defense, and a three-day-and-night live fire at mock town Simpsonville. The harbor defense exercise was conducted in Seward this year, with U.S. Navy and Coast Guard and Canadian Navy units participating in a combined Harbor Defense Command. The USMC Reserve Unit from Anchorage provided opposition force (OPFOR) assets for the harbor defense portion of the exercise. 

During Northern Edge 2000, there were a number of live-fire exercises, an airborne operation, and multiple close air support missions flown. A robust theatre missile defense cell took part in the exercise by conducting anti-ballistic missile operations against a simulated attack. Global Hawk, an unmanned aerial vehicle, made its first appearance in Northern Edge providing battlefield commanders with near real-time aerial imagery.

Northern Edge 2001 facilitated unit level training, theatre engagement, and joint operations in a cold climate. Additionally, the naval exercise emphasized joint and combined port security and harbor defense operations in a friendly host nation. The highlight of the naval exercise, for the second year in a row, was the use of trained dolphins to help detect underwater intruders.

Northern Edge 2002 had the benefit of training with crews from an aircraft carrier and its accompanying support ships. The  operated from the Gulf of Alaska, and its aircraft, including the new F-18 Super Hornet, flew into the interior of the state to hone their warfighting skills training with and against other military participants. Some of the skills practiced include air interdiction against main supply routes, precision strikes, combat search and rescue of downed aircrew and tactical airlift support. The area around Valdez served as the backdrop for the maritime activities and ground defense maneuvers, which cent on protecting the visiting  and the Valdez Marine Terminal.

The war in Iraq forced the scope of Northern Edge 2003 exercise to contract, but it was still the state's largest annual joint training exercise. The exercise focused on homeland defense scenarios and incorporated theatre missile defense, force protection, air-to-air fighter aircraft engagements, joint exercises, combat search and rescue, harbor defense and maritime operations.

Northern Edge 2004 
More than 9,000 Airmen, Sailors, Marines, Soldiers and Coast Guardsmen from active duty, reserve and National Guard units participated in Northern Edge 2004, which focused on air-centric tactics and procedures with an emphasis on air-to-air, air-to-ground and personnel recovery operations in remote areas of the Pacific Alaska Range Complex near Fairbanks, Alaska and over water in the Gulf.

While traditionally held in the cold weather months, for 2004, Northern Edge was moved to June to accommodate the worldwide scheduling of combat forces and availability of the carrier strike group. Held from June 7 through June 16, 2004, Northern Edge training focused on air-centric tactics and procedures with an emphasis on air-to-air, air-to-ground and personnel recovery operations in remote areas of the Pacific Alaska Range Complex (PARC) near Fairbanks, Alaska, and over water in the Gulf. Though most flight operations went according to plan, naval aviators frequently operated in low visibility conditions with thick cloud ceilings over the Gulf. Along with aircraft from Carrier Group Seven, several other air units participated, including the Pacific Air Forces, 1st Marine Aircraft Wing from Okinawa, Japan, and several fighter units from Pacific Air Forces, robust aerial tanker support, multi-service helicopter support, and a fighter unit from Mountain Home AFB, Idaho.

The carrier  paid a port visit to Esquimalt, British Columbia, between June 18–21, 2004, and carried out bi-lateral exercises with the Royal Canadian Navy between June 22–29, 2004. Carrier Strike Group Three also paid a port visit to Pearl Harbor between June 22–26, 2004, prior to RIMPAC 2004.

Subsequent Northern Edge exercises focus on homeland defense/homeland security operations during odd-numbered years and on joint warfare operations during even-numbered years.

Alaska Shield/Northern Edge 2005 
Northern Edge 2005 took place from August 15–19, 2005. It was combined with the State of Alaska's homeland security exercise called Alaska Shield, and incorporated federal, state and local organizations in natural and human-made disaster and terrorist-related scenarios. After more than a year of planning and preparation, the U.S. Northern Command with the Alaska Division of Homeland Security and Emergency Management and others conducted Alaska Shield and Northern Edge 2005. A wide range of simulated natural disasters and terrorist events occurred in 21 communities throughout Alaska designed to train military and civilian "first responders" and test organizational skills at all levels of government. It was considered a capstone event for Alaska's three year Homeland Security Exercise and Evaluation Plan. Scenario elements included an earthquake in Juneau, bio-terrorism in Ketchikan and Juneau, critical infrastructure protection at Fort Greely refinery, and terrorist attacks in various cities throughout Alaska.

Northern Edge 2006 
Northern Edge 2006 was a joint training exercise from June 5–16, 2006. The exercise was aimed at helping prepare forces to respond to crises in the Asian Pacific region. Approximately 5,000 US active duty and reserve component soldiers, sailors, airmen and marines participated in the exercise by executing defensive counter-air, close-air support, air interdiction of maritime targets and personnel recovery missions. The exercise involved over 110 aircraft and two US Navy destroyers, namely the  out of Seward and the  out of Homer.

Alaska Shield/Northern Edge 2007 
Northern Edge 2007 combined with Alaska Shield took place from April 30 to May 17, 2007. Its purpose was for local, state, federal, DoD, and non-governmental organizations and agencies to practice responding to a national crisis in a full range of training scenarios. This was the largest response readiness exercise in the history of the State of Alaska, involving more than 75 agencies and approximately 7,000 people. Military and civilian participants worked together to intercept aircraft, respond to attacks on the Trans-Alaska Pipeline System and the North Pole Industrial Complex, and conducted medical evacuations after mass casualty incidents.

Northern Edge 2008
Northern Edge 2008 was held May 5–16, 2008. More than 5,000 participants from five service branches of the United States Armed Forces (Air Force, Army, Navy, Marines and Coast Guard) from active duty, reserve and National Guard units were involved. It will help prepare forces to respond to crises in THE Asia-Pacific (APAC) region. Participants practiced defensive counter-air ,close-air support, air interdiction of maritime targets, it also focused on search and rescue efforts among personnel.

Northern Edge 2009

-Operation Northern Edge was held between 15–26 June 2009. This joint exercise provided real-world proficiency in detection and tracking of units at sea, in the air and on land and response to multiple crises, with about 9,000 U.S. active-duty and reserve-component military personnel participating.  It was designed to be an air-centric exercise to train units in joint air operations tactics and command and control in a cost-effective and low-risk environment, with more than 200 aircraft from every branch of the U.S. military involved. Lt. General Dana T. Atkins, USAF, the commanding general of Alaskan Command and Eleventh Air Force, noted:

Northern Edge is the premier exercise conducted within the Pacific Command's area of responsibility. It lets our joint military men learn about each other.

Northern Edge operations was conducted within the Joint Pacific Alaska Range Complex, which includes more than 60,000 square miles (155,399.29 square Kilometers) of air space, and the Gulf of Alaska, which encompasses 50,000 square miles (129,499.40 square Kilometers) of air space.

On  22 June 2009, during the Northern Edge exercise, Governor of Alaska Sarah Palin visited the nuclear-powered aircraft carrier .  Stennis (pictured) was the flagship of Carrier Strike Group Three which also consisted of Carrier Air Wing Nine (CVW-9) and the guided-missile cruiser .

Northern Edge 2015

The 2013 exercise was cancelled due to budget sequestration in 2013. 
The military did not publicly announce the dates for Northern Edge ‘15, and a Freedom of Information Act request was required. Several Southcentral communities held protests in May.
The City Council of Cordova, Alaska passed a resolution to formally oppose the Navy’s training exercises. The city found "no scientific information or traditional knowledge demonstrating that the training activities can take place without negatively affecting salmon, whale, bird and other marine habitats".The exercise is designed to sharpen tactical combat skills, improve command, control and communication within the US.

Northern Edge 2019
The USS Theodore Roosevelt participated in Northern Edge 2019, marking the first time in a decade a carrier took part in the exercise. Approximately 10000 US military personnel participated in exercise northern edge 2019. It is a joint training exercise hosted by US air forces, which was held on MAY 13,2019 on and above central Alaska.

Northern Edge 2021 
Major US units including one carrier strike group and the Makin Island amphibious ready group and embarked 15th marine expeditionary unit.

The exercise is designed to provide realistic high-tech war fighter training and develop joint interoperability, and enhance the readiness for combat. This is done by providing a venue large enough for large force training and multi-domain operations and traing that focuses on tactical parts

References

External links

Military exercises involving the United States